The MCKK Premier 7's 2012 was the second tournament of the annual, invitational Malay College Rugby Premier Sevens, which involved teams from Malaysia premier schools, states champions and international schools (Vajiravudh College of Thailand). It were held from 25th till 26 February 2012. The tournament were won by Sekolah Sukan Tengku Mahkota Ismail with an impressive performance beating Sekolah Menengah Sultan Yahya Petra in Cup final with score 38-10 to secure the NJ Ryan Cup for two successive time.

Competition format
The schedule featured a total of 48 matches, divided into half for two days. The first day were filled with groups matches. The 24 teams were grouped into 8 groups consisting of 3 teams per group. The second day were filled with tournament knock-out stages. The third placing teams of each group will contest in quarter-finals Shield while the second-placing teams of each group contested in quarter-finals Bowl. Whereas the group champions will fight their places in Cup/Plate quarter-finals.

Group stage

Group A

Group B

Group C

Group D

Group E

Group F

Group G

Group H

Finals

Shield

Bowl

Cup/Plate Quarter Finals
The winner of the quarter finals gain entrance to Cup semi-finals. The defeated at this quarter final gain entrance to Plate semi-finals.

Plate

Cup

Sponsors
Premier Sponsor - Government of Malaysia and Telekom Malaysia 
Major Sponsors - UEM Group, Scomi, Air Asia, MTU Services, Hopetech, Ernst and Young, Sissons Paints, Saji, Karangkraf
Official Drink - Gatorade
Official Car - Proton
Official Radio - AMP
Official Rugby Equipment - Salbros
Official Logistics - SA Kargo
Official Medical Service Provider - KPJ Healthcare

See also 

 Rugby League World Cup
 Women's Rugby World Cup
 Rugby World Cup Overall Record

References

2012
2012 rugby sevens competitions
2012 in Asian rugby union
rugby union